Florence Marga Richter (October 21, 1926 – June 25, 2020) was an American composer of classical music, and pianist.

Biography
Marga Richter was born in Reedsburg, Wisconsin, the daughter of the American soprano Inez Chandler (1885–1956) and a German army captain, Paul Richter. She studied piano at the MacPhail School of Music in Minneapolis with Irene Hellner and with Helena Morsztyn in New York. She entered the Juilliard School of Music in 1945 and studied composition with William Bergsma and Vincent Persichetti and piano with Rosalyn Tureck, graduating with a BS and then MS degree in 1951. After completing her studies, she taught music appreciation at Nassau Community College from 1971–72, and later began working as a composer full-time.

Richter composed several works for the Harkness Ballet in the early 1950s.  Her music was also performed, recorded, and produced on numerous albums by MGM recordings at this time.  During the 1970s, two of Richter's Large-scale orchestral works Landscapes of the Mind I and Blackberry Vines and Winter Fruit received significant performances, and she received a publishing contract from Carl Fischer.  During the 1980s, Richter composed vocal and choral music in addition to symphonic and chamber works.  Richter's only opera Riders to the Sea was composed in the 1990s. Deeply connected to those in her personal world, Richter composed works to honor various individuals important to her, such as Lament for her mother, Threnody for her father, and numerous others.

Richter co-founded the Long Island Composers Alliance in 1972 with Herbert Deutsch and served as its co-director, president and vice-president. Richter has a son, pianist Michael Skelly and a daughter who is a nurse. A full-length biography of Richter was published in 2012 by the University of Illinois Press as part of their series on Women Composers. She died on June 25, 2020 at Barnegat, New Jersey.

Compositional style and influence 
Marga Richter's musical style emphasizes chromaticism, a free use of dissonance, ostinatos, layering, rhythmic excitement, and dramatic pacing.  She favored much use of seconds and sevenths.  Her music often draws upon American, Irish, and Asian sources for inspiration.  While she taught only a handful of students, she inspired many later women composers, including composer Dianne Goolkasian Rahbee.
Richter is noted for being one of the few women composers from her time who composed music for large-scale forces: orchestra, ballet, and ensembles.  She composed one opera, Riders to the Sea.

Honors and awards
Annual awards from ASCAP since 1966
Two grants from the National Endowment for the Arts (1977, 1979)
Martha Baird Rockefeller Fund grant
Meet the Composer grant
National Federation of Music Clubs grant

Selected works
Richter composed for orchestra, ballet, opera, chorus, orchestra, chamber ensemble and solo instrument and her compositions have been performed internationally. Selected works include:

Abyss (1-act ballet, choreography by Stuart Hodes), orchestra, 1964
Bird of Yearning (1-act ballet, choreography by Stuart Hodes), orchestra, 1967
Riders to the Sea (1-act chamber opera, libretto by John Millington Synge) 1996
Concerto for Piano and Violas, Cellos and Basses, 1955
Lament, string orchestra, 1956
Aria and Toccata, viola, string orchestra, 1957
Variations on a Sarabande, 1959
Eight Pieces for Orchestra, large orchestra, 1961 (version of piano work)
Darkening of the Light for viola solo (1961)
Suite for solo viola (1962)
Bird of Yearning, small orchestra (28 players), 1967 (version of ballet)
Concerto No. 2 Landscapes of the Mind I, piano, large orchestra, 1968–74
Fragments, 1978
Country Auction, symphonic band, 1976
Blackberry Vines and Winter Fruit, 1976
Spectral Chimes/Enshrouded Hills, 3 quintets, orchestra, 1978–80
Düsseldorf Concerto, flute, harp, viola, small orchestra (timpani, percussion, strings), 1981–82
Out of Shadows and Solitude, large orchestra, 1985
Quantum Quirks of a Quick Quaint Quark, 1991
Variations and Interludes on Themes from Monteverdi and Bach (concerto), violin, cello, piano, large orchestra, 1992
Three Songs of Madness and Death (text by John Webster), mixed chorus, 1955;
Psalm 91, mixed chorus, 1963
Variations on a Theme by Neidhart von Reuenthal, piano, 1974
Quantum Quirks of a Quick Quaint Quark No. 2, piano, 1992
Soundings, harpsichord or piano, 1965
Short Prelude in Baroque Style, harpsichord or piano 1974

Discography
Richter's works have been recorded and issued on CD including:

William George, Andrea Lodge, Dew-drops On A Lotus Leaf & Other Songs, Redshift
London Philharmonic Orchestra, Blackberry Vines and Winter Fruit, Leonarda
Seattle Symphony, Out of Shadows and Solitude, MMC-Master Musicians Collective
Czech Radio Symphony Orchestra, Spectral Chimes/Enshrouded Hills and Quantum Quirks of a Quick Quaint Quark, MMC
Seattle Symphony, Out of Shadows and Solitude, MMC-Master Musicians Collective
Journeys: Orchestral Works by American Women—Leonarda Productions, LE327, 1985. Features Richter's Lament--For String Orchestra 1956, and also includes music of Nancy Van De Vate, Kay Gardner, Libby Larsen, Katherine Hoover, Ursula Mamlok, Jane Brockman. Performed by Bournemouth Sinfonietta, Arioso Chamber Orchestra, Carolann Martin: Conductor.

References

External links
Marga Richter Biography
Marga Richter website
 Women of Influence in Contemporary Music - A Focus on Nine American Women
Marga Richter's page at Carl Fischer
Catalog of works
Interview with Marga Richter, July 18, 1996

1926 births
20th-century classical composers
American women classical composers
American classical composers
American music educators
American women music educators
American opera composers
Juilliard School alumni
2020 deaths
People from Reedsburg, Wisconsin
Women opera composers
American people of German descent
20th-century American women musicians
20th-century American composers
20th-century women composers
21st-century American women